The 2000 Campeonato Brasileiro Série A (officially the Copa João Havelange) was the 44th edition of the Campeonato Brasileiro Série A, the top-level of professional football in Brazil. Due to legal complications, the championship was organized by Clube dos 13 instead of CBF, and was contested by 116 teams divided in modules, equivalent to their division—similar to the 1987 Copa União. It started on July 29 and ended on January 18, 2001, with Vasco da Gama winning the championship—its fourth title. The name of the championship was an homage to former CBF and FIFA president João Havelange.

Background
The formula of relegation of the 1999 Brasileirão was based on the average points between 1998 and 1999. But due to a decision of the Supreme Court of Sporting Justice (STJD) of removing points from São Paulo, who played against Botafogo and Internacional with an irregular player, Brasília team SE Gama was going to dispute Série B instead of Botafogo. Gama refused the relegation and, supported by the Distrito Federal Football Coaches Trade Union and political party PFL, sued CBF requesting a return to Série A. By June 2000, the trial was not solved, and CBF could not release the 2000 Brasileirão rules.

A deal with Clube dos 13 allowed it to organize a championship, which CBF would later ratify. To avoid further legal problems, the championship would encompass all divisions. The module equivalent to the top division would have the 18 teams which escaped relegation in 1999, the two teams promoted by 1999 Série B, and five teams which would contest Série B in 2000 (Série C champion Fluminense, Clube dos 13 member Bahia, Juventude, América-MG and Gama, who removed the lawsuit against CBF and was allowed by FIFA to participate).

Controversies
As 1987 Copa União organized by Clube dos 13, Copa João Havelange was surrounded by critics for its exotic and unconventional maths system, by breaking the rules promoting América-MG, Bahia, and Fluminense from the Série B (second division) for the top Brazilian football competition. Many have seen the taunts and jeers acts of Romário against Luiz Felipe Scolari (who indirectly criticized him) in the semi-finals as decisive for Scolari ignore him for the squad of the 2002 FIFA World Cup. The end of competition was marked by disaster in São Januário.

First stage

Group Blue

Group Yellow

Group Green and White

Knockout stage

Qualified teams

Bracket

Round of Sixteen

|}

Quarterfinals

|}

Semifinals

|}

Final

Final standings

Team ranked by round advanced. For teams that advanced to the same round, combined result separate the tie.

All teams qualified to Copa Libertadores also qualified to Serie A

1 As Copa do Brasil winner2As Copa dos Campeões winner3As a member of Série A 1999

References

 Goal and attendances are Blue Module and knockout stages only.
 Blue Module only. Biggest overall: Jundiaí 7-0 Moto Clube and Jundiaí 7-0 Matonense, both for Green Module.
Brazil - List of final tables (RSSSF)

 
Joao
2000
Joao